Harold Spurr (17 June 1889 – 21 December 1962) was an English cricketer. He was a right-handed batsman who played for Essex. He was born in Leytonstone and died in Dunmow.

Spurr made a single first-class appearance for the side, during a West Indian tour of England in 1923. From the upper order, Spurr scored thirteen runs in two innings. He was never again selected for the team.

External links 
 Harold Spurr at Cricket Archive 

1889 births
1962 deaths
English cricketers
Essex cricketers
People from Leytonstone
People from Great Dunmow